The Unidad Deportiva Solidaridad is a multi-use stadium in Reynosa, Tamaulipas, Mexico.  It is currently used mostly for football matches and is the home stadium for Reynosa F.C.  The stadium has a capacity of 20,000 people.

References

External links

Sports venues in Tamaulipas
Unidad Deportiva Solidaridad
Athletics (track and field) venues in Mexico